Haberlandia rudolphi is a moth in the family Cossidae. It is found in the Democratic Republic of Congo. The habitat consists of lowland rainforests.

The wingspan is about 27.5 mm. The fore- and hindwings are deep colonial buff.

Etymology
The species is named for Werner Rudolph, a friend of the author.

References

Natural History Museum Lepidoptera generic names catalog

Moths described in 2011
Metarbelinae
Taxa named by Ingo Lehmann
Endemic fauna of the Democratic Republic of the Congo